Now That's What I Call Motown is a special edition compilation album from the (U.S.) Now That's What I Call Music! series and was released on January 13, 2009. Released by Universal Motown Records to coincide with the 50th anniversary of Motown Records, the album is made up of songs exclusively from the original Motown label.

Track listing

Charts

2009 compilation albums
Motown